Darboux is a surname. Notable people with the surname include:

Jean Gaston Darboux (1842–1917), French mathematician
Lauriane Doumbouya (née Darboux), the current First Lady of Guinea since 5 September 2021
Paul Darboux (1919–1982), Beninese politician